(born 1963 in Tokyo) is a Japanese film director.

Career
Born in Tokyo, Shinozaki attended Rikkyo University, where he studied under Shigehiko Hasumi, made 8mm films, and appeared in the then amateur works of other Rikkyo graduates such as Kiyoshi Kurosawa. After graduating, he worked at the film company Cine Saison and starting writing about film and doing long interviews of directors such as Quentin Tarantino and Takeshi Kitano for magazines. While working as a projectionist for the Athénée Français Cultural Center in Tokyo, he saved up enough money to make his first 35mm film, Okaeri, for which he won the Wolfgang Staudte Award at the Berlin Film Festival in 1995. His next feature film, Not Forgotten, was screened at the Three Continents Film Festival, where its stars, Tomio Aoki, Tatsuya Mihashi, and Minoru Ōki, shared the best actor award. Having developed a close relationship with Takeshi Kitano, Shinozaki has made a documentary on the filming of Kikujiro as well as a TV movie based on Kitano's autobiographical novel Asakusa Kid. He has also produced the Cop Festival series featuring short films by directors such as Kiyoshi Kurosawa, Shinji Aoyama, Akihiko Shiota, and Hirokazu Koreeda. Continuing to write on film, he has published a history of horror cinema with Kiyoshi Kurosawa. 

Shinozaki continues to direct films while also serving as professor in the Department of Expression Studies of the College of Contemporary Psychology at Rikkyo University. His drama film, Since Then, premiered at the Tokyo International Film Festival in 2012.

Filmography

Feature films
 Okaeri (1995) aka Welcome Home
 Not Forgotten (2000)
 Walking With the Dog (2003)
 0093 (2007)
 Tokyo Island (2010)
 Kaiki: Tales of Terror from Tokyo (2010)
 Die! Directors, Die! (2011)
 Since Then (2012)
 Sharing (2014)

Fiction short films
 Masters of Killing (2006)

Documentary films
 Jam Session (1999)

Television
 Asakusa Kid (2002)

References

External links
 
 Midnight Eye interview conducted by Tom Mes
 Midnight Eye interview conducted by Jasper Sharp

Japanese film directors
Academic staff of Rikkyo University
Rikkyo University alumni
1963 births
Living people